DiCaprio 2 is the second studio album by American rapper JID, hosted by DJ Drama. It was released on November 26, 2018, by Dreamville Records, Interscope Records and Spillage Village. The album serves as the follow up to his debut album, The Never Story (2017), and a sequel to his extended play DiCaprio (2015). The album was supported by two singles: "151 Rum" and "Off Deez" with J. Cole.

The album features guest appearances from 6LACK, ASAP Ferg, BJ the Chicago Kid, Ella Mai, J. Cole, Joey Badass and  Method Man. Production of DiCaprio 2 was handled by a variety of record producers, including Christo, J. Cole, Elite, Nice Rec, Hollywood JB, WondaGurl, Kenny Beats, Skhye Hutch, Ron Gilmore, ChaseTheMoney and the late Mac Miller among others, contributing to the album.

The album explores a variety of topics including competition, loyalty, criticism, depression, drug abuse and women's empowerment. It also touches on other topics such as gang violence, African-American culture, and love.

Background
JID said that each song on the album feels "like an individual film", and rapper Mac Miller helped post-produce and arrange almost every song on the album before his untimely death. JID was supposed to serve as an opening act for Mac Miller on his Swimming Tour, but the tour was cancelled. JID has also said that rapper J. Cole helped him work on the storytelling for this album. The album experienced several delays due to issues with sample clearances.

Artwork and title
On September 15, 2018, JID revealed promotional artwork for the album. The design draws inspiration from the film Inception (2010), and is a replica of the "spinning top" which never quite stops as the movie comes to an end. On October 31, 2018, J.I.D revealed what was then billed as the album's official artwork, which features Konrad Annerud, a model and look-alike of actor and film producer Leonardo DiCaprio. The album was released on November 26, 2018 with the cover of the DiCaprio look-alike as the official artwork, but was mysteriously changed a week later on streaming services to the alternate artwork which features JID in the form of a golden statuette holding a number two and was inspired by the iconic Academy Awards statuette. JID later confirmed that the artwork featuring the golden statuette was the new official cover for the album and explained the change of artwork to fans on Twitter saying, "That artwork is what the artwork was supposed to be upon release but they couldn't change until after we dropped for upload reason."

The album's title was inspired by DiCaprio; JID has cited DiCaprio as his favorite actor. JID's manager Zekiel "Zeke" Nicholson explained why the album is an interesting contrast between the artist and actor:

Release and promotion
On October 31, 2018, to celebrate his birthday, JID revealed the album's release date. On November 11, 2018, JID revealed the album's tracklist, blurring out the album's remaining features, other than J. Cole on already released single, "Off Deez". JID revealed the remaining features on November 15. On November 19, 2018, JID released the album's trailer. In the trailer, JID depicts six scenes from DiCaprio's films: Inception, The Revenant, The Wolf Of Wall Street, Titanic, Django Unchained, and The Aviator, with album instrumentals for each scene.

JID announced the first leg of his Catch Me If You Can tour on December 4, 2018, in support of the album. Leg one begun on January 22, 2019 in Eugene, Oregon and conclude in New Orleans on March 23, 2019. Reason, Lou The Human and Hardo served as opening acts on the first leg of the tour. The second leg of the tour was announced on February 12, 2019, Saba, Mereba, Deante' Hitchcock and Mez served as supporting acts.

Singles
On September 16, 2018, JID announced the album's first single titled, "151 Rum". The single was released on September 19. The song was produced by Christo and Nice Rec. The music video was released on May 1, 2019.

On November 4, 2018, JID announced the album's second single, "Off Deez" featuring J. Cole. The song was released on November 6, and was produced by ChaseTheMoney, with additional production from Dro Fe. The music video for "Off Deez" was released on December 4, 2018, and was directed by Cole Bennet. The video features a cameo from rapper Joey Badass.

Other songs
"Hasta Luego" was originally released on July 7, 2017. The song was initially recorded for his debut album, The Never Story (2017). On October 3, 2018, JID premiered the song "Workin Out" on A COLORS SHOW. On November 28, 2018, JID performed "Skrawberries" on the Tonight Show Starring Jimmy Fallon with BJ the Chicago Kid and Thundercat, paying tribute to the late Mac Miller. On March 6, 2019, JID released the music video for "Off da Zoinkys", directed by Scott Lazer. The music video recreates the opening tracking shot from Robert Altman's 1973 film The Long Goodbye, based on Raymond Chandler's 1953 novel of the same title. The video stars actor and singer Ansel Elgort playing Philip Marlowe.

Critical reception

DiCaprio 2 was met with critical acclaim. At Metacritic, which assigns a normalized rating out of 100 to reviews from mainstream publications, the album received an average score of 80, based on six reviews, indicating "generally favorable reviews". Writing for Uproxx, Aaron Williams praised the album calling it "the blueprint for the next generation of talent in the rap game". He continued saying: "DiCaprio 2 is a masterclass in the good things that happen when an up-and-coming talent takes the game seriously enough to work on the skills. JID's one of those rappers who'd be compelling on his own; his story, voice, and charisma are all enough to make him a star almost by default." Mitch Findlay of HotNewHipHop gave the album an 87% rating saying, "DiCaprio 2 has positioned him for something truly monumental. It might be too early to count him among the game's best current lyricists. But then again, there's no time like the present."

In a positive review from HipHopDX, Scott Glaysher said, "As cliché as it sounds, there is something for everyone and their mother on DiCaprio 2. J.I.D. breaks the mold originally set by J. Cole, takes all the best parts and mixes them with his own distinctive practice and pitch that work seamlessly with the array of trap and soulful beats (Thanks Christo and company)." Jonah Bromwich of Pitchfork complimented the sounds of each track with noting that "J.I.D's melodic instincts are strong, sharing ties with Isaiah Rashad and even, occasionally, Bone Thugs, and he has the ability to get jokes off even in the midst of triple-time rapping, a la Big L or Lil Wayne. Eric Lowers of Exclaim! admired its concept of the whole body of work saying "Dicaprio 2 exemplifies what the ideal student of the game sounds like — someone who's conscious of how a hook presents itself, how to control their delivery and how to diversify their lyrical bonds. He added that "Though J.I.D isn't as seasoned as Leonardo DiCaprio just yet, he is the inception of what makes someone the G.O.A.T.". Jerome Taylor of Comm Radio praised the albums details saying that "Although the most remarkable aspect of the album is J.I.D's technical lyrical ability, he also showcases the ability to provide social commentary, be introspective, and deliver impressive R&B cuts during the middle of DiCaprio 2".

Accolades

Commercial performance
With only four days of tracking, the album sold 16,970 album-equivalent units in the first week, debuting at number 41 on the US Billboard 200 chart and number 21 on the US Top R&B/Hip-Hop Albums chart.

In other media
The track "Skrawberries" appeared on the 2019 video game NBA 2K20.

Track listing

Notes
  signifies an additional producer
  signifies an uncredited producer
 "Skrawberries" was originally titled "Skrawberries (For Da Ladies)"
 "Off Deez", "Off da Zoinkys", "Hot Box", "Mounted Up", and "Just Da Other Day" features additional vocals by DJ Drama
 "Workin Out" features additional vocals by Zack Fox and Ayden
 "Tiied" features additional vocals by Yung Baby Tate and Mereba
 "Despacito Too" features additional vocals by Zayden Johnson

Sample credits
”Off Deez” contains a sample from “Esclavo Y Amo” written by José Flores and performed by Los Pasteles Verdes.
"Off da Zoinkys" contains a sample from "I'm So Grateful (Keep In Touch)" written by Clara Shepherd and Jimmy Weary and performed by Crowns of Glory.
"Workin Out" contains a sample from "Don't Explain" written by Arthur Herzog and Billie Holiday and performed by Helen Merrill.
"Skrawberries" contains a sample from "No If's &'s or But's" written by Patrick Adams and Louis David and performed by J. J. Barnes.
"Hot Box" contains a sample from "I Love Music" written by Hale Smith and Emil Boyd and performed by Ahmad Jamal Trio.
 "Tiiied" contains a sample from "Happy Turnout" written and performed by Andrzej Zylis.
"Despacito Too" contains a sample from "Earth Tones" written by Bob James and performed by Grove Washington Jr.
"Hasta Luego" contains a sample from "Puella in Somnio" (from the Puella Magi Madoka Magica soundtrack) written by Yuki Kajiura.

Personnel

Instrumentation
 Sebastian Ramirez − bass 
 Masego − saxophone 

Technical
 Raul Chirinos − mixing , recording 
 Juro "Mez" Davis − mixing , recording  
 John "Christo" Welch − recording 
 Chris Athens − mastering  
 Hector Castro − recording 
 Malcolm McCormick − recording arranger

Charts

References

Further reading 

2018 albums
JID albums
Dreamville Records albums
Interscope Records albums
Albums produced by J. Cole
Albums produced by Cubeatz
Albums produced by Mac Miller
Albums produced by WondaGurl